Washington Township is one of twelve townships in Porter County, Indiana. As of the 2010 census, its population was 4,785.

History
Washington Township was organized in 1836.

Cities and towns
There are no incorporated communities in the township.

Education
Washington Township is served by the East Porter County School Corporation.  Their high school is Washington Township Middle-High School, located on State Route 2, east of Valparaiso.

References

External links

 Indiana Township Association
 United Township Association of Indiana

Townships in Porter County, Indiana
Townships in Indiana